The municipalities (Montenegrin: opštine / општине, singular: opština / општина) are the first level administrative subdivisions of Montenegro. The country is divided into 25 municipalities including the Old Royal Capital Cetinje and the Podgorica Capital City. Podgorica is divided into one subdivision called city municipality (Montenegrin: gradska opština / градска општина, plural: gradske opštine / градске општине), forming the most basic level of local government.

Recently created:
Petnjica Municipality (2013)
Gusinje Municipality (2014)
Tuzi Municipality (2018)
Zeta Municipality (2022)

The Union of Municipalities of Montenegro is a national association of local authorities of Montenegro.

List

Politics
List of current mayors and local governments
 (7)  (5)  (3)  (2)  (1)  (1)  (1)  (1)  (1)  (1)  (1)  (1)

Local parliaments of Montenegro

See also

List of regions of Montenegro
Cities and towns of Montenegro
Populated places of Montenegro
Subdivisions of Montenegro
ISO 3166-2:ME

References

External links
 Statistical Office of Montenegro – MONSTAT. Population census 2003
 Statistical Office of Montenegro – MONSTAT. Census of Population, Households and Dwellings in Montenegro 2011. Population by age, sex, and type of settlement per municipality, as well as the most frequent name in Montenegro.
 Census of Population, Households and Dwellings in Montenegro,  2011 (preliminary data).
Interactive Map of Montenegro Municipalities

 
Subdivisions of Montenegro
Montenegro, Municipalities
Montenegro 1
Municipalities, Montenegro
Montenegro geography-related lists